Consumer Credit Legal Service (WA) Inc is one of 28 non-profit community legal centres in Western Australia and a member of the National Association of Community Legal Centres. CCLS WA provides legal advice and representation to customers in WA in the areas of credit, banking, and finance. CCLS WA also takes an active role in community legal education, law reform and policy issues affecting consumers.

The organisation is funded by the Commonwealth and Western Australian governments through the Community Legal Services Program.

Areas of Practice 
CCLSWA provides legal advice in the areas of credit, banking, and finance.

Solicitors at CCLSWA assist clients by providing the advice and information to enable them to resolve their problems. CCLSWA strives to equip callers with the knowledge and tools to self-advocate whenever possible. As well as providing advice, CCLSWA will assist clients to access cost-free industry dispute resolution bodies, such as the Financial Ombudsman Service and the Credit Ombudsman Service Limited. CCLSWA may also assist clients to self-advocate in the Supreme Court and the Magistrates Court. Occasionally, staff may agree to represent a clients in legal proceedings in the courts and or the State Administrative Tribunal, depending on the needs of the client, the complexity of the case and existing case loads.

References 

Legal organisations based in Australia